The Representation of the People Act 1918 was an Act of Parliament passed to reform the electoral system in Great Britain and Ireland. It is sometimes known as the Fourth Reform Act. The Act extended the franchise in parliamentary elections, also known as the right to vote, to men aged over 21, whether or not they owned property, and to women aged over 30 who resided in the constituency or occupied land or premises with a rateable value above £5, or whose husbands did. At the same time, it extended the local government franchise to include women aged over 21 on the same terms as men. It came into effect at the 1918 general election.

As a result of the Act, the male electorate was extended by 5.2 million to 12.9 million. The female electorate was 8.5 million. The Act also created new electoral arrangements, including making residence in a specific constituency the basis of the right to vote, institutionalising the first-past-the-post method of election, and rejecting proportional representation, although this failed by only seven votes in the Commons during the Act's progress.

It was not until the Representation of the People (Equal Franchise) Act 1928 that women gained electoral equality. The 1928 Act gave the vote to all women aged over 21, regardless of any property qualification, which added another five million women to the electorate.

Background
After the Third Reform Act in 1884, 60% of male householders over the age of 21 had the vote. This left 40% who did not – including the poorest in society. Thus millions of soldiers returning from World War I would still not have been entitled to vote in the long overdue general election. (The last election had been in December 1910. An election had been scheduled for 1915, but was postponed to a time after the war.)

The issue of a female right to vote first gathered momentum during the latter half of the nineteenth century. In 1865, the Kensington Society, a discussion group for middle-class women who were barred from higher education, met at the home of Indian scholar Charlotte Manning in Kensington. Following a discussion on suffrage, a small informal committee was formed to draft a petition and gather signatures, led by women including Barbara Bodichon, Emily Davies, and Elizabeth Garrett. In 1869, John Stuart Mill, published The Subjection of Women (1861, published 1869), one of the earliest works on this subject by a male author. In the book, Mill attempts to make a case for perfect equality. He talks about the role of women in marriage and how it needed to be changed, and comments on three major facets of women's lives that he felt were hindering them: society and gender construction, education, and marriage. He argued that the oppression of women was one of the few remaining relics from ancient times, a set of prejudices that severely impeded the progress of humanity. He agreed to present a petition to Parliament, provided it had at least 100 signatures, and the first version was drafted by his step-daughter, Helen Taylor.

The Suffragettes and Suffragists had pushed for their right to be represented prior to the war, but felt too little had changed, despite violent agitation by the likes of Emmeline Pankhurst and the Women's Social and Political Union.

The suffragist Millicent Fawcett suggested that the women's right to vote issue was the main reason for the Speaker's Conference in 1917. She was frustrated by the resultant age limit, though recognising that there were one and a half million more women than men in the country at the time (due to the loss of life in the First World War), accepted that this would not have wide, cross-party support; many of those in favour of suffrage at the Speaker's Conference still wanted to maintain a male majority. Recalling Disraeli's quip, she noted that Britain "is governed not by logic, but by Parliament".

The debates in both Houses of Parliament saw majority cross-party unanimity. The Home Secretary, George Cave (Con) within the governing coalition introduced the Act:

Terms of the Act

The Representation of the People Act 1918 widened suffrage by abolishing practically all property qualifications for men and by enfranchising women over 30 who met minimum property qualifications. The enfranchisement of this latter group was accepted as recognition of the contribution made by women defence workers. However, women were still not politically equal to men (who could vote from the age of 21 if they were willing to serve British rule); full electoral equality was achieved in Ireland in 1922, but did not occur in Britain until the Representation of the People (Equal Franchise) Act 1928.

The terms of the Act were:
 All men over 21 gained the vote in the constituency where they were resident. Men who had turned 19 during service in connection with World War I could also vote even if they were under 21, although there was some confusion over whether they could do so after being discharged from service. The Representation of the People Act 1920 clarified this in the affirmative, albeit after the 1918 general election.
 Women over 30 years old received the vote, but only if they were registered property occupiers (or married to a registered property occupier) of land or premises with a rateable value greater than £5 or of a dwelling-house and not subject to any legal incapacity, or were graduates voting in a university constituency.
 Some seats were redistributed to industrial towns. Seats in Ireland were amended separately, by the Redistribution of Seats (Ireland) Act 1918.
 All polls for an election to be held on a specified date, rather than over several days in different constituencies as previously.

The Act added 8.4 million women to the electorate as well as 5.6 million men. It was therefore the greatest of all the Reform Acts in terms of electorate addition.

The costs incurred by returning officers were for the first time to be paid by the Treasury. Prior to the 1918 general election, the administrative costs were passed on to the candidates to pay in addition to their expenses.

Political changes
The size of the electorate tripled from the 7.7 million who had been entitled to vote in 1912 to 21.4 million by the end of 1918.  Women now accounted for about 39.64% of the electorate. Had women been enfranchised based upon the same requirements as men, they would have been in the majority because of the loss of men in the war.

The age of 30 was chosen because it was all that was politically possible at the time. Any attempt to make it lower would have failed.

As Lord Robert Cecil explained shortly after the Act was passed:

In addition to the suffrage changes, the Act also instituted the present system of holding all voting in a general election on one day, as opposed to being staggered over a period of weeks (although the polling itself would only take place on a single day in each constituency), and brought in the annual electoral register.

Votes
The bill for the Representation of the People Act was passed by a majority of 385 to 55 in the House of Commons on 19 June 1917. The bill still had to pass through the House of Lords, but Lord Curzon, the president of the National League for Opposing Woman Suffrage did not want to clash with the Commons and so did not oppose the bill. Many other opponents of the Bill in the Lords lost heart when he refused to act as their spokesman. The bill passed by 134 to 71 votes.

Aftermath
The first election held under the new system was the 1918 general election. Polling took place on 14 December 1918, but vote-counting did not start until 29 December 1918.

After this Act gave about 8.4 million women the vote, the Parliament (Qualification of Women) Act 1918 was passed in November 1918, allowing women to be elected to Parliament. Several women stood for election to the House of Commons in 1918, but only one, the Sinn Féin candidate for Dublin St. Patrick's, Constance Markievicz, was elected; however she followed her party's abstentionist policy and did not take her seat at Westminster and instead sat in the Dáil Éireann (the First Dáil) in Dublin. The first woman to take her seat in the House of Commons was Nancy Astor on 1 December 1919, who was elected as a Coalition Conservative MP for Plymouth Sutton on 28 November 1919.

As Members of Parliament, women also gained the right to become government ministers. The first woman cabinet minister and Privy Council member was the Labour Party's Margaret Bondfield, Minister of Labour from 1929 to 1931.

Although the Representation of the People Act extended the franchise significantly, it did not create a complete system of one person, one vote. Seven percent of the population enjoyed a plural vote in the 1918 election, mostly middle-class men who had an extra vote due to a university constituency (this Act increased the university vote by creating the Combined English Universities seats) or by occupying business premises in other constituencies.

See also
 Electoral reform in the United Kingdom
 Parliamentary franchise in the United Kingdom 1885–1918
 Reform Acts
 Representation of the People Act
 Suffragette bombing and arson campaign
 Timeline of women's suffrage
 Women in the House of Commons of the United Kingdom
 Women in the House of Lords
 Women's suffrage in the United Kingdom

References

Sources

Citations

Further reading
 The text of the act.
 Image of Act on the Parliamentary website.

United Kingdom Acts of Parliament 1918
Representation of the People Acts
Women's suffrage in the United Kingdom
1918 in women's history
February 1918 events
1918 in British politics